In mathematics, a level set of a real-valued function   of  real variables is a set where the function takes on a given constant value , that is:

 

A level set is a special case of a fiber.

Alternative names

Level sets show up in many applications, often under different names.  For example, an implicit curve is a level curve, which is considered independently of its neighbor curves, emphasizing that such a curve is defined by an implicit equation. Analogously, a level surface is sometimes called an implicit surface or an isosurface.

The name isocontour is also used, which means a contour of equal height. In various application areas, isocontours have received specific names, which indicate often the nature of the values of the considered function, such as isobar, isotherm, isogon, isochrone, isoquant and indifference curve.

Examples 

For example, because . Geometrically, this means that the point  lies on the circle of radius 5 centered at the origin. More generally, a sphere in a metric space  with radius  centered at  can be defined as the level set .

A second example is the plot of Himmelblau's function shown in the figure to the right. Each curve shown is a level curve of the function, and  they are spaced logarithmically: if a curve represents , the curve directly "within" represents , and the curve directly "outside" represents .

Level sets versus the gradient

To understand what this means, imagine that two hikers are at the same location on a mountain. One of them is bold, and he decides to go in the direction where the slope is steepest. The other one is more cautious; he does not want to either climb or descend, choosing a path which will keep him at the same height. In our analogy, the above theorem says that the two hikers will depart in directions perpendicular to each other.

At a critical point, a level set may be reduced to a point (for example at a local extremum of  ) or may have a 
singularity such as a self-intersection point or a cusp.

Sublevel and superlevel sets
A set of the form

 

is called a sublevel set of f (or, alternatively, a lower level set or trench of f). A strict sublevel set of f is

 

Similarly

 

is called a superlevel set of f (or, alternatively, an upper level set of f). And a strict superlevel set of f is

 

Sublevel sets are important in minimization theory. By Weierstrass's theorem, the boundness of some non-empty sublevel set and the lower-semicontinuity of the function implies that a function attains its minimum. The convexity of all the sublevel sets characterizes quasiconvex functions.

See also 
 Epigraph
 Level-set method
 Level set (data structures)

References

Multivariable calculus